Daniel Goldberg may refer to:

 Daniel Goldberg (politician) (born 1965), French Socialist politician
 Daniel Goldberg (producer), Canadian film producer and writer
 Dan Goldberg (tennis) (born 1967), American tennis player